Clinton is the largest city in DeWitt County, Illinois, United States. The population was 7,004 at the 2020 census.  It is the county seat of DeWitt County.

The city and the county are named for DeWitt Clinton, governor of New York, 1817–1823. Clinton Nuclear Generating Station is located six miles away on Clinton Lake.

Geography

Clinton is centrally located in the heart of Illinois, at  (40.152240, -88.959214), accessible from Routes 51, 54, and 10.

History
The city was founded in 1835 by Jesse W. Fell of Bloomington, Illinois, a land speculator and lawyer, and James Allen, a representative in the Illinois State Legislature. The two men were on their way from Decatur, Illinois back to Bloomington after a business trip and stopped to rest their horses on the open prairie halfway between the two cities. It occurred to them that this was an ideal location for a settlement, as there was nothing else nearby. They named the town in honor of DeWitt Clinton.

Clinton is on the 8th Judicial Circuit, on which Abraham Lincoln traveled, along with Judge David Davis, for twenty years. Lincoln acted as lawyer because lawyers were scarce in the area at the time.

One of the two registered historical locations in DeWitt County, the C.H. Moore House, is located in Clinton. The house was purchased and improved by lawyer Clifton H. Moore in the 1880s, and is now the DeWitt County Museum. Moore's private library of more than 7,000 volumes was left to the city upon his death in 1901. These books would make up the first collection of the Vespasian Warner Public Library, founded by and named for Moore's son-in-law.

In 1858, Abraham Lincoln gave a speech in Clinton to which the following quotation has  been attributed:

on Sept. 18, according to Carl Sandburg. However, there is no official transcript of the speech. Lincoln's collected papers has a version of the speech taken from a contemporary copy in the Bloomington Pantagraph which doesn't contain it. It has also been attributed to a speech by Lincoln in Bloomington, IL two years earlier, and there is controversy over whether or not Lincoln ever said it at all.

Demographics
As of the 2020 census there were 7,004 people, 3,102 households, and 1,676 families residing in the city. The racial makeup of the city was 91.49% White, 1.06% African American, 0.19% Native American, 0.30% Asian, 0.16% Pacific Islander, 2.60% from other races, and 4.21% from two or more races. Hispanic or Latino of any race were 5.15% of the population.

There were 3,102 households, out of which 40.94% had children under the age of 18 living with them, 36.78% were married couples living together, 13.25% had a female householder with no husband present, and 45.97% were non-families. 42.94% of all households were made up of individuals, and 17.67% had someone living alone who was 65 years of age or older. The average household size was 2.97 and the average family size was 2.18.

The city's age distribution consisted of 24.3% under the age of 18, 8.1% from 18 to 24, 25% from 25 to 44, 23.2% from 45 to 64, and 19.4% who were 65 years of age or older. The median age was 39.0 years. For every 100 females, there were 90.4 males. For every 100 females age 18 and over, there were 93.2 males.

The median income for a household in the city was $46,741, and the median income for a family was $63,125. Males had a median income of $40,918 versus $26,554 for females. The per capita income for the city was $27,368. About 9.2% of families and 15.9% of the population were below the poverty line, including 25.2% of those under age 18 and 6.4% of those age 65 or over.

Economy
The major employers in Clinton include the Clinton Nuclear Power Plant, Warner Hospital & Health Services, Miller Container, RR Donnelley, and HNC Products Inc., and Liberty Village of Clinton.

Attractions

Recreation and entertainment
The annual Apple and Pork Festival draws ten times or more of the population to the city to visit, partake, and purchase items typifying the town.
Terror on Washington Street is an annual haunted house run by Clinton's Chamber of Commerce.
May Days is an annual festival that has carnival rides as well as live music and various other entertainment events.
 Clinton High School Band is a highly regarded group in Clinton, IL.

Nature and wildlife
Clinton Lake (Illinois) and Weldon Springs State Recreation Area are nearby state parks.
There are seven small parks within the town which include facilities such as lighted tennis courts, basketball courts, baseball and softball fields, as well as other playground equipment.

Other attractions
The C. H. Moore House is the center of the Dewitt County Museum.
Mr. Lincoln's Square is one of the locations Abraham Lincoln delivered a campaign address.
Dewitt County Fairgrounds

Notable people 

 Al Atkinson, pitcher with the Chicago Browns, Baltimore Monumentals and Philadelphia Athletics
 Keith Brendley, business leader and expert in active protection systems
 Charlie Irwin, third baseman with the Chicago Colts, Cincinnati Reds and Brooklyn Superbas
 Mike Overy, relief pitcher for the California Angels; born in Clinton
 Doc Marshall, catcher with the 1908 Chicago Cubs and physician; lived and died in Clinton 
 William Querfeld, Illinois state representative, farmer, grain dealer, and farm implement dealer
 Gene Vance, a member of the 1942–43 University of Illinois basketball team known as the Whiz Kids
 Vespasian Warner, member of Congress, and later United States Commissioner of Pensions

References

External links

Official Site
 DeWitt County
 Clinton Unit School District #15
 Clinton Area Chamber of Commerce & Tourism Bureau
 Clinton Lake
 Weldon Springs

Cities in Illinois
Cities in DeWitt County, Illinois
County seats in Illinois
Populated places established in 1835